FC Krasnodar is a Russian professional football club based in Krasnodar that plays in the Russian Premier League. The club was founded in 2008. In 2009, the club was promoted to the Russian First Division, the second highest division of the Russian football league system, despite finishing Zone South of Second Division in third. At the end of the 2010 season, they were promoted to the Russian Premier League for the 2011 season, despite finishing fifth in the first division.

In 2013, FC Krasnodar began the construction of the 35,074-seat Krasnodar Stadium which was opened on 9 October 2016. Until the stadium was completed, FC Krasnodar continued playing their home matches in the Kuban Stadium.

After the 2022 Russian invasion of Ukraine, the European Club Association suspended the team, along with all other Russian club and national teams, from European competition.

History
The club owner and founder is Sergey Galitsky, a Russian businessman who has been rewarded by the Russian Football Union for his dedication to development of football in Russia.

Early years
In February 2008, FC Krasnodar had been granted professional status which allowed them enter Second Division (the third tier of Russian professional football). Its first official match was a 0–0 draw against FC Nika Krasny Sulin. The team was at that time managed by Vladimir Volchek.

FC Krasnodar finished third in the 2008 Second Division season. Although the third place does not grant promotion to the upper tier of Russian football league, FC Krasnodar had been invited by PFL to take part in the 2009 First Division tournament. This happened because SKA Rostov and Sportakademklub refused to take part in the tournament despite finishing high enough to avoid relegation.

After being promoted, the club appointed Nurbiy Khakunov as manager. Krasnodar finished its debut First Division campaign tenth in the league table.

In the next season, FC Krasnodar was managed by Sergei Tashuyev. In this year, the team faced another club from Krasnodar city, FC Kuban. The first match between the rival clubs took place on 12 June 2010, where FC Kuban won 3–0. The second match also granted no points to FC Krasnodar as they lost the game 0–1. However the team's overall performance in this season had been more successful  compared to previous year. They ended up 5th.

Promotion to the Premier League
In December 2010, FC Krasnodar signed a contract with Serbian manager Slavoljub Muslin. Before the start of the next season, FC Krasnodar got another promotion despite finishing fifth in the league. This happened because Saturn Ramenskoye, Nizhny Novgorod and KAMAZ declined to play in the Russian Premier League due to financial problems. On 25 January 2011, the Premier League committee decided to replace FC Saturn with FC Krasnodar.

After promotion to the Premier League, the team performed with mixed success. Both matches against perennial title contender CSKA Moscow ended in draws, which could be considered success considering the disparity between the two's squad strengths. However, in both matches against another top Premier League club in Spartak Moscow, the team conceded eight goals, losing away and home matches, 4–0 and 2–4, respectively. Other notable matches FC Krasnodar played were the ones against FC Kuban; matches between the two marked the first Premier League derby not involving Moscow-based clubs. In the first match, FC Krasnodar won 0–1, though FC Kuban won the second match, 0–2. During the season, club owner Sergey Galitsky stated that he was satisfied with his team's performance, also stating that he wants his team to play in a manner fascinating for spectators, and that he does not plan on buying expensive players; instead, the club should evolve steadily, "step by step." FC Krasnodar ultimately finished the 2011–12 season ninth in the league table.

The team's second season in 2012–13 was less successful. The team lost all but one match against the eventual top-three teams in the league. FC Krasnodar ended the year in tenth, one of the likelier reasons that led the board to terminate manager Slavoljub Muslin's contract. Muslin himself, however, stated that he was sacked because the club stopped investing into the club to improve its on-field performance.

On 11 August 2013, Belarusian coach Oleg Kononov was named manager of FC Krasnodar, with club management also bolstering the squad ahead of the 2013–14 season, with Ari, Artur Jędrzejczyk and Andreas Granqvist joining the club.

These personnel changes awarded the club a top-five Premier League finish, making it eligible to compete in the UEFA Europa League for the first time in its history for 2014–15. FC Krasnodar also advanced to the Russian Cup Final where the club was narrowly defeated by Rostov in a penalty shoot-out. FC Krasnodar successfully completed three Europa League qualification phases after defeating Sillamäe Kalev, Diósgyőr and Real Sociedad on aggregate. The team then advanced to the Group Stage, where they were drawn into Group H alongside Lille, Wolfsburg and Everton, eventually finishing third.

The following year Krasnodar got to the Europa League group stage for the second time in a row. Their group consisted of Borussia Dortmund, PAOK and Gabala. They won all their home games and pulled off a 1–0 win against Dortmund. They finished first with 4 wins (1–0 against Dortmund, 2–1 against PAOK, 2–1 and 3–0 against Gabala), 1 draw (0–0 against PAOK and 1 loss (1–2 against Dortmund). They continued to the round of 32 and were drawn against Sparta Prague. They lost 1–0 in their away game and lost a poor home game, 3–0.

Their 2019–20 season was marred by injuries. Viktor Claesson and Rémy Cabella suffered ACL tears (Claesson missed whole season and Cabella played 12 games), Yury Gazinsky, Ari and Uroš Spajić all missed months of play. After eliminating Porto in the Champions League third qualifying round, they lost to Olympiacos 1–6 on aggregate in the play-off round. In the subsequent Europa League campaign, the club did not advance from group stage to the knock-out rounds. In the RPL, Krasnodar led the table early in the season, but finished the league in the 3rd spot, only qualifying for the Champions League qualifying rounds again; however, they managed to qualify to the 2020–21 UEFA Champions League group stage for the first time in their history. They also became the only Russian team to advance from the group stage of UEFA competitions that season, before being eliminated in the Europa League Round of 32 by Dinamo Zagreb. On the domestic front, the 2020–21 Russian Premier League season was not very successful, as the club spent most of the season mid-table, they finished in 10th place and failed to qualify for European competition after 7 consecutive seasons of doing so. Late in the season, Murad Musayev resigned as manager and was replaced by Viktor Goncharenko on a contract until the summer of 2023. 8 Months later, in January 2022, Viktor Goncharenko was sacked as head coach of the club. On 13 January 2022, Krasnodar announced Daniel Farke as Viktor Goncharenko's replacement as head coach. Farke and his coaching staff left the club on 2 March 2022, due to the Russian invasion of Ukraine. On 3 March 2022, 8 foreign players' contracts were suspended, but not terminated. The players would train on their own, but remain under contract. However, on 5 March 2022, Viktor Claesson was the first foreign player to be released from the club.

After the 2022 Russian invasion of Ukraine, the European Club Association suspended the team.  German Manager and former Norwich City Football Club head coach Daniel Farke left his position in light of the Russian invasion, and his three assistant coaches left with him.

League position

Achievements

Non-official
 Match Premier Cup: 1
Winners (1): 2019

European history
On 17 July 2014, FC Krasnodar played its first-ever match in the UEFA Europa League, playing Estonian club Sillamäe Kalev. FC Krasnodar took a conclusive 4–0 victory. The second match between these teams was also won by Krasnodar; the score was 5–0. In the next round, FC Krasnodar faced Diósgyőr, winning both matches by 5–1 and 3–0 scorelines, respectively.

In a draw for the playoff round, FC Krasnodar was unseeded, which brought them a much stronger opponent, Spanish club Real Sociedad. The first match against this club ended up in a 1–0 defeat, though FC Krasnodar won the second match 3–0, taking them to the competition's group stage.

The following year, Krasnodar got to the Europa League group stage for the second time in a row. Their group consisted of Borussia Dortmund, PAOK and Gabala. They won all their home games, and even pulled off a surprising 1–0 win against Dortmund. They finished first with four wins (1–0 against Dortmund, 2–1 against PAOK, 2–1 and 3–0 against Gabala), one draw (0–0 against PAOK) and one loss (1–2 against Dortmund). They continued to the round of 32, and were drawn against Sparta Prague. They lost 1–0 in their away game, and lost their home game 3–0.

Overall

Matches

Notes
 2Q: Second qualifying round
 3Q: Third qualifying round
 PO: Play-off round
 R32: Round of 32
 R16: Round of 16

Stadium

The first stadium FC Krasnodar played its official matches at is Trud stadium. It is a 3,000-seat stadium situated in the southern part of Krasnodar city.

The stadium was used in 2008 when FC Krasnodar was playing in the Second Division. But after promotion to the First Division the stadium's capacity ceased to be enough. Therefore, in 2009 FC Krasnodar had to move to Kuban Stadium (the stadium which is also used by FC Kuban).

In 2013 FC Krasnodar began to construct its own stadium with a capacity of 35,074 seats. The stadium project was created by English and German companies. The estimated cost of this stadium is €200 million. The stadium will meet the requirements for hosting international matches.
Café, club shop, museum, nightclub, several banquet rooms, fitness room, business clubs and children's room will be located inside the stadium.

Ownerships, kit suppliers, and sponsors

Players

Krasnodar-2
As of 22 February 2023, according to the First League website.

Out on loan

Coaching staff

WFC Krasnodar, FC Krasnodar-2 and FC Krasnodar-3

A professional farm club called FC Krasnodar-2 was founded in 2013 and participated in the Russian Professional Football League (third tier). It was promoted to the second-tier Russian Football National League for the 2018–19 season, and formerly amateur FC Krasnodar-3 was licensed for the PFL.

Youth academy 
FC Krasnodar owns a network of youth football schools spread over 20 cities in two Russian regions – Krasnodar Krai and Adygea. The main school is situated in the eastern part of Krasnodar. The Academy infrastructure includes 10 football fields, a 3000-seat stadium, a medical rehabilitation center, a swimming pool, a sauna, and a gym. There is also a dining room, an assembly hall, offices and hotel rooms for students' parents.  
The club owner Sergey Galitsky has stated that his goal is to compose the majority of the FC Krasnodar squad from locally trained players.

Notable players
Had international caps for their respective countries. Players whose name is listed in bold represented their countries while playing for Krasnodar.
Russia

Former USSR countries

Europe

Africa

South America

Managers

Notes:

References

External links

 

 
Football clubs in Krasnodar
Association football clubs established in 2008
2008 establishments in Russia